Mehdi Ahmadi (born February 14, 1994, in Tehran) is an Iranian painter, film actor and artist.

Career 
He is a graphic design graduate of the University of the Arts. He started painting and his first solo exhibition was held. He has participated in more than thirty painting exhibitions. He also started acting by acting in the film In the Alleys of Love directed by Khosrow Sinaei.

Filmography 

 Maybe it was not love (2017)
 Forty-seven (2017)
 Berg Jan (2016)
 Is coming in the morning (2014)
 Purple (Film) (2014)
 Colorful Island (2014)
 Slow in Silence (2012)
 Evangelism to a citizen of the third millennium (2012)
 Eyes (2014)

References

External links 

 
 

Iranian male film actors
Iranian male television actors
1994 births
Living people